Nizami Bandhu are an Indian musical group composed of Ustad Chand Nizami, Shadab Faridi and Sohrab Faridi Nizami.

They perform Qawaali written by the poet Amir Khusro in honour of Nizamuddin Auliya.

Filmography
Band gained fame after featured in song Kun Faya Kun directed by music director and composer A R Rahman from movie Rockstar in 2011 after that band was sung and featured in movie Bajrangi Bhaijaan where band seen performing at Hazrat Nizamuddin Dargah.

History
The families of the group members have sung at Indian shrines for centuries. In the Nineteenth century the families expanded their performances to events such as weddings, private mehfils, and movies.

In 2011, the current group appeared in the song Kun Fayakun in the film Rockstar, performing at the Nizamuddin Dargah, along with actor Ranbir Kapoor. In 2015 they appeared in the movie Bajrangi Bhaijaan which was directed by Kabir Khan, and performed the song "Aaj Rang Hai" which was written by poet Amir Khusro. The group is directed and promoted by Akshay KR Singh.

Past qawwals in this tradition
Aashaq Khan (1865-1946)

Mushtaq Khan (1887-1965)

Mahmood Nizami (1909-1992)

Ghulam Farid Nizami (1965-2003)

References

External links
 Official Website

Indian qawwali groups
Indian musical groups
Indian qawwali singers
Performers of Sufi music
Indian styles of music
Qawwali
Hindi cinema
Bollywood playback singers
Filmi singers
21st-century Indian singers
Indian folk music groups
Indian folk singers